Oppedal is a surname. It may refer to:

Odd Oppedal (1936–2018), Norwegian footballer
Ytre Oppedal, a village and ferry terminal in Gulen municipality in Sogn og Fjordane county, Norway